Johannes "Jan" Nortje (born 11 April 1975) is a South African professional kickboxer, mixed martial artist and undefeated professional boxer who has fought for Strikeforce, DREAM, K-1, Inoki Genome Federation, PRIDE Fighting Championship and New Japan Pro-Wrestling.

He has fought the likes of Jérôme Le Banner, Gary Goodridge, and K-1 Champions Mirko Cro Cop, Ernesto Hoost, Peter Aerts and Semmy Schilt. His last MMA fight was a loss against Rameau Thierry Sokoudjou at DREAM.9.

He lost to Lechi Kurbanov by way of an extension round split decision on 29 June 2013 in Grozny, Chechnya.

Mixed martial arts record

|-
| Loss
| align=center| 2–6
| Sokoudjou
| TKO (punches)
| DREAM 9
| 
| align=center| 1
| align=center| 2:30
| Yokohama, Japan
| DREAM Super Hulk Grand Prix Opening Round; Super Heavyweight bout.
|-
| Win
| align=center| 2–5
| Bob Sapp  	  	   		
| TKO (punches)
| Strikeforce: At The Dome
| 
| align=center| 1
| align=center| 0:55
| Tacoma, Washington, United States
| Super Heavyweight bout.
|-
| Loss
| align=center| 1–5
| Gary Goodridge 
| TKO (punches)   	 
| Hero's 8 
| 
| align=center| 1
| align=center| 3:00
| Nagoya, Japan
| 
|-
| Loss
| align=center| 1–4
| Masayuki Naruse	
| Submission (rear-naked choke)  
| K-1
| 
| align=center| 1
| align=center| 4:40
| Nagoya, Japan
| 
|-
| Loss
| align=center| 1–3
| Shinsuke Nakamura  	  	
| TKO (submission to strikes)
| NJPW Ultimate Crush
| 
| align=center| 2
| align=center| 3:12
| Tokyo, Japan
| 
|-
| Win
| align=center| 1–2
| Tadao Yasuda 
| TKO (soccer kicks) 	    	 	
| Inoki Bom-Ba-Ye 2002
| 
| align=center| 2
| align=center| 0:57
| Saitama, Saitama, Japan
| 
|-
| Loss
| align=center| 0–2
| Yoshihisa Yamamoto
| Submission (armbar) 	   	 	
| PRIDE 18
|  
| align=center| 1
| align=center| 1:43
| Fukuoka Prefecture, Japan
| 
|-
| Loss
| align=center| 0–1
| Gary Goodridge 
| Submission (armbar) 
| K-1 Andy Memorial 2001 Japan GP Final
| 
| align=center| 1
| align=center| 1:11
| Saitama, Saitama, Japan
|

K-1 kickboxing record

Professional boxing record

Titles
Former South African Kickboxing Superheavyweight Champion
Former All-African Heavyweight Champion
K-1 2007 World Grandprix in Hawaii Semi Finalist

References

External links

Profile at K-1
Jan Nortje Official PRIDE Profile

1975 births
Living people
Sportspeople from Cape Town
Afrikaner people
Kickboxing trainers
South African male mixed martial artists
Super heavyweight mixed martial artists
Mixed martial artists utilizing boxing
South African male kickboxers
Heavyweight kickboxers
Heavyweight boxers
South African male professional wrestlers
People from Potchefstroom
South African male boxers